Digitivalva macedonica is a moth of the family Acrolepiidae. It is found in North Macedonia and Greece.

References

Acrolepiidae
Moths described in 1956
Moths of Europe